The 2015 Atlantic Coast Conference (ACC) softball tournament was held at the Tech Softball Complex on the campus of Virginia Tech in Blacksburg, Virginia from May 7 through May 9, 2015. Top seeded Florida State won the tournament, beating the Pitt Panthers, and thus earned the Atlantic Coast Conference's automatic bid to the 2015 NCAA Division I softball tournament.  The quarterfinals and semifinals were shown on the ACC RSN's with a simulcast on ESPN3. The championship game was broadcast by ESPN.

Tournament

All times listed are Eastern Daylight Time.

References

Atlantic Coast Tournament
Atlantic Coast Conference softball tournament